Anandalok Puraskar or Anandalok Awards ceremony is one of the most prominent film events given for Bengali Cinemas in India. The Anandalok, only film magazine in Bengali language, published from Ananda Publishers and Ananda Bazar Patrika presents this Award (Puraskar). The magazine was started on 25 January 1975  and the awards (Puraskar) ceremony was started in 1998.

Winners

See also

 List of Asian television awards

References

Bengal film awards
Awards established in 1993
Civil awards and decorations of West Bengal
Indian television awards
Awards for actresses